
Christian Corbet (born 1966) is a Canadian artist. He is a Sculptor in Residence for the Royal Canadian Navy.

Works
In 2011, the National Museum of Ireland acquired a forensic facial reconstruction of an Irish-born Canadian soldier from World War I named Thomas Lawless, also known as the Avion I Project as sculpted by Christian Corbet.

In 2013, a bust by Corbet of Prince Philip, Duke of Edinburgh was unveiled.
The sculpture was created in Buckingham Palace and was commissioned by The Royal Canadian Regiment. 

In 2017, Corbet created a sculpture of Robert the Bruce, based on casts of the skull.  Andrew Nelson of the University of Western Ontario determined that King Robert the Bruce did not die of leprosy. The sculpture is in the permanent collection of Stirling Smith Art Gallery and Museum.

In 2022 Corbet was commissioned to sculpt an authorized forensic facial reconstruction of King Tutankhamun for the 100th anniversary of the discovery of his tomb. Corbet and the sculpture were featured in a 2 hour movie on PBS Tutankhamun Allies and Enemies which aired in 2022.

In 2012 Corbet was awarded the Queen Elizabeth Diamond Jubilee Medal.

References

1966 births
Living people
20th-century Canadian painters
Canadian male painters
21st-century Canadian painters
University of Western Ontario alumni
Canadian people of Norman descent
20th-century Canadian sculptors
Canadian male sculptors
20th-century Canadian male artists
21st-century Canadian male artists